Juraj Ančic (born 12 July 1981) is a Slovak international football midfielder who played for clubs in the Czech Republic and Slovakia. He is currently manager of Šamorín.

Career
Born in Trenčín, Ančic began playing football for the youth side of TTS Trenčín. He signed his first professional contract with Dukla Ozeta Trenčín.

Ančic joined Czech Gambrinus liga side FC Slovan Liberec in 2002. He was unable to work his way into Slovan's starting squad on a regular basis and went on a six-month loan to Sparta Prague in January 2007. In the summer of 2007, he moved on to MŠK Žilina.

After a short spell with Žilina, he joined AS Trenčín in late 2008. He left the club in the summer 2009 and spent the fall at Spartak Bánovce. In 2011 he joined FC Kyjov 1919.

Coaching career
In the beginning of January 2012, Ančic was hired at AS Trenčín as a youth coach. On 29 January 2018, Ančic was promoted to the first team assistant manager under head manager Vladimír Cifranič. He worked in this position for a year, before joining Inter Bratislava also as an assistant manager. Ančic actually switched position with Richard Slezák, who worked for Inter Bratislava and joined AS Trenčín as an assistant manager, while Ančic took his position at Inter Bratislava.

In January 2022, Ančic entered his third managerial spell at Trenčín, but only lasted half-season and was replaced by Peter Hyballa ahead of the new 2022–23 season. His spell was commented on in the media as largely successful, exhibiting dominance in the Relegation Group, while also supporting players like Adam Tučný, Dominik Hollý or Philip Azango in their development. It was also noted, that club advisor Ivan Galád did not support Ančic's continuation at the club.

References

External links
 
 
 

1981 births
Living people
Sportspeople from Trenčín
Slovak footballers
Slovak football managers
Slovakia international footballers
Slovakia under-21 international footballers
Slovakia youth international footballers
Czech First League players
FC Slovan Liberec players
AC Sparta Prague players
MŠK Žilina players
Slovak Super Liga players
AS Trenčín players
FK Slovan Duslo Šaľa players
Expatriate footballers in the Czech Republic
Slovak expatriate sportspeople in the Czech Republic
AS Trenčín managers
Slovak Super Liga managers
Association football midfielders